State Road 11 in the U.S. state of Indiana is located in south central Indiana and is divided into a northern and southern section.  These sections were never connected.

Route description

Southern section 
The southern portion is a southwest-northeast road in Floyd and Harrison counties. Its southern terminus is at State Road 135 near the town of Mauckport, which is on the Ohio River.

Northern section 
The northern portion is a north–south road in Bartholomew and Jackson counties.

History

Southern section 
Before 1935 the southern section of SR 11 was number State Road 33 (SR 33).  Then in 1935 U.S. Route 33 (US 33) was commissioned in Indiana and SR 33 was decommissioned.

Northern section 
In the 1970s the northern section of SR 11 was numbered U.S. Route 31 Alternate.

Major intersections

References

External links

Indiana Highway Ends - SR 11

011
Transportation in Jackson County, Indiana
Transportation in Floyd County, Indiana
Transportation in Bartholomew County, Indiana
Transportation in Harrison County, Indiana
U.S. Route 31
Columbus, Indiana